College of Staten Island Baseball Complex is a stadium in Staten Island, New York.  It is primarily used for baseball and was the home of Staten Island Yankees before they moved to Richmond County Bank Ballpark in 2001.  The ballpark had a capacity of 2,500 people and opened in 1999.  It currently hosts the College of Staten Island Dolphins baseball team.

References 

Sports venues in Staten Island
Minor league baseball venues
Baseball venues in New York City
1999 establishments in New York City
Sports venues completed in 1999
College baseball venues in the United States